In August 2022 the bodies of two children were found in suitcases in Auckland, New Zealand. The suitcases were bought from the sale of a storage unit where the bodies are suspected to have been stored for multiple years. The mother of the children has been arrested and awaits trial in 2024.

Victims
The children were a girl and a boy born in 2009 and 2012. New Zealand police have said the children may have been dead for up to four years.

Discovery and investigation
On August 11, 2022, human remains were found in two suitcases in Moncrieff Ave, Clendon Park. The suitcases were bought by a family as part of a storage unit auction from Safe Store Papatoetoe. The family brought the suitcases home along with other household objects. Police believe the family who bought the suitcases were not related to the murder.

The victims were the children of Korean-born parents. The children's father died of cancer in New Zealand in late 2017, before the children’s disappearance. The children's mother, a Korean-born New Zealander, arrived in South Korea in 2018 and has not left that country since.

Arrest and extradition 
On 15 September the arrest of the children's mother in Ulsan, South Korea was announced. New Zealand authorities commenced extradition proceedings through the South Korean court system. The woman was arrested by Korean police on suspicion of "crimes against humanity", and will face two murder charges in New Zealand.

In November 2022, the South Korean Minister of Justice Han Dong-hoon approved the suspect's extradition. Earlier, the Seoul High Court had approved the woman's extradition after she had granted written consent. On 29 November, the children's mother was extradited by South Korean authorities, who also submitted "significant pieces of evidence" to their New Zealand counterparts.

Pre-trial procedures
On 30 November, she appeared at the Manukau District Court in South Auckland where she entered no plea. The suspect was remanded into custody and the identities of the suspect, her children, and an unidentified relative were suppressed. On 14 December she pleaded not guilty. She will be remanded in custody until a case review hearing in March 2023. Trial date is set for 4 weeks starting on April 29, 2024.

References

2022 crimes in New Zealand
2020s in Auckland
August 2022 events in New Zealand
Crime in Auckland
Child murder